Jules Basile Onambele (born April 11, 1982) is a Cameroonian footballer who currently plays in midfielder for Persin Sinjai.

References

External links 
 Profile at Liga Indonesia Official Site

Cameroonian footballers
Cameroonian expatriate footballers
Cameroonian expatriate sportspeople in Indonesia
Living people
Expatriate footballers in Indonesia
1982 births
Liga 1 (Indonesia) players
Indonesian Premier Division players
Gresik United players
PSIS Semarang players
PSM Makassar players
Association football midfielders